Ḿ, ḿ (m-acute) is a letter in Chinese pinyin. In Chinese pinyin ḿ is the yángpíng tone (阳平, high-rising tone) of “m”. It was also used in an old version of the Sorbian alphabet and in older Polish.

This letter is also used in the Bube alphabet, a language from Equatorial Guinea.

Character mappings

See also
Acute accent

M, acute
Polish letters with diacritics